Malta is a city in, and the county seat of, Phillips County, Montana, United States, located at the intersection of U.S. Routes 2 and 191. The population was 1,860 at the 2020 census.

History

After James Hill and his partners built the St. Paul, Minneapolis, and Manitoba railway (which in 1890 became the Great Northern Railway) across Montana's "High Line" in 1887, Malta evolved from rail siding number 54. What came to be Saco, Montana, to the east and Dodson, Montana, to the west grew from other nearby sidings. A post office was established in Malta in 1890. Its name is said to have been determined by a spin of the globe by a Great Northern official whose finger came to rest on the island of Malta in the Mediterranean Sea.

On July 3, 1901, Kid Curry (Harvey Logan), as part of Butch Cassidy's Wild Bunch, robbed a train just west of Malta, near Wagner, Montana, making off with about $40,000.

One of the best preserved dinosaurs ever discovered and one of only four that were fossilized is a 77-million-year-old Brachylophosaurus nicknamed Leonardo, unearthed north of Malta in 2000. Leonardo, together with brachylophosaurs Elvis (1994), Roberta (2003) and Peanut (2002), is on display at The Great Plains Dinosaur Museum.

Two stops on The Montana Dinosaur Trail are located in Malta. They are:
 The Great Plains Dinosaur Museum and Field Station (home to the Judith River Dinosaur Institute)
 The Phillips County Museum and the H.G. Robinson House and Gardens

Geography

Malta is on the High Plains of Montana. The Little Rocky Mountains are located south of the town. The city of Malta gets their water from wells.  The well water is pumped to two water tanks located at the top of a residential area known as Hillcrest.  The water is treated to meet safety standards, then it enters the city water distribution system.

Malta experiences a semi-arid climate (Köppen BSk) with long, cold, dry winters and hot, wetter summers.

Demographics

2020 census
As of the census of 2020, there were 1,860 people, 912 households, and (not yet available) families residing in the city.  There were 1,016 housing units, of which 857 were occupied.  The racial makeup of the city was 1,564 (84.1%) White, 1 African American, 88 (4.7%) Native American, 9 (0.5%) Asian, 46 (2.5%) from other races, and 152 (8.2%) from two or more races. There were 70 (3.8%) Hispanic or Latino.  

47.8% of households were married couples living together, 26% had a female householder with no husband present, 25.5% had a male householder with no wife present. The average family size was 2.98.

50.9% were married, not separated, 12.9% widowed, 9.8% divorced, and 26.3% never married (29.8% in MT overall).

The median age was 51.4 (compared to 40.5 in MT overall), 5.6% were under 5 years, 21.4% were under 18, 78.6% were 18 and older, and 27.6% were 65 and older (19.5% in MT).  44.7% claimed German ancestry, 21.3% Norwegian ancestry, and 16.7% Irish ancestry.  12.8% were veterans.

The median income for a household in the city was $44,189 ($57,153 in MT overall), and the median income for a family was $52,974. Males had a median income of $30,117 versus $18,636 for females. About 8.4% of the population were below the poverty line (12.6% in MT overall), including 1.6% of those under age 18, 13.7% of those 18 - 64, and 3.4% of those age 65 or over.

18.6% of residents had a Bachelor's degree or higher, compared to 33.6% in MT overall.

2010 census
As of the census of 2010, there were 1,997 people, 902 households, and 539 families residing in the city. The racial makeup of the city was 88.2% White, 0.1% African American, 5.5% Native American, 0.4% Asian, 0.3% from other races, and 5.7% from two or more races. Hispanic or Latino of any race were 2.0% of the population.

There were 902 households, of which 26.6% had children under the age of 18 living with them, 46.8% were married couples living together, 10.0% had a female householder with no husband present, 3.0% had a male householder with no wife present, and 40.2% were non-families. 36.6% of all households were made up of individuals, and 17.6% had someone living alone who was 65 years of age or older. The average household size was 2.16 and the average family size was 2.81.

The median age in the city was 46.8 years. 23.1% of residents were under the age of 18; 5.8% were between the ages of 18 and 24; 18.6% were from 25 to 44; 29.5% were from 45 to 64; and 23.2% were 65 years of age or older. The gender makeup of the city was 46.7% male and 53.3% female.

2000 census
As of the census of 2000, there were 2,120 people, 907 households, and 565 families residing in the city. The population density was 2,006.1 people per square mile (772.2/km2). There were 1,067 housing units at an average density of 1,009.7 per square mile (388.7/km2). The racial makeup of the city was 92.83% White, 0.05% African American, 4.67% Native American, 0.24% Asian, 0.05% Pacific Islander, 0.19% from other races, and 1.98% from two or more races. Hispanic or Latino of any race were 1.04% of the population.

There were 907 households, out of which 28.3% had children under the age of 18 living with them, 49.9% were married couples living together, 9.7% had a female householder with no husband present, and 37.6% were non-families. 33.7% of all households were made up of individuals, and 18.1% had someone living alone who was 65 years of age or older. The average household size was 2.27 and the average family size was 2.90.

In the city, the population was spread out, with 24.7% under the age of 18, 5.8% from 18 to 24, 23.1% from 25 to 44, 24.3% from 45 to 64, and 22.1% who were 65 years of age or older. The median age was 43 years. For every 100 females there were 93.1 males. For every 100 females age 18 and over, there were 87.0 males.

The median income for a household in the city was $31,212, and the median income for a family was $41,422. Males had a median income of $30,117 versus $18,636 for females. The per capita income for the city was $16,405. About 8.8% of families and 13.1% of the population were below the poverty line, including 14.4% of those under age 18 and 8.8% of those age 65 or over.

Education
Malta Public Schools educates students from kindergarten through 12th grade. Malta High School's team name is the Mustangs/Mustangettes.

Phillips County Library is a public library in Malta.

Transportation

 Amtrak serves Malta (Amtrak station) daily with the Empire Builder service running between Chicago and Seattle/Portland. 
 Malta Airport

Media
 KMMR FM 100.1 (Country music)

See also
 Trachodon mummy

References

Further reading

 
 Murphy, N.L., D. Trexler, and M. Thompson. 2002. Exceptional soft-tissue preservation in a mummified ornithopod dinosaur from the Campanian Lower Judith River Formation. Society of Vertebrate Paleontology meeting. Oct. 9-12. Norman, Okla.

Cities in Phillips County, Montana
County seats in Montana
1890 establishments in Montana
Cities in Montana

External links